Ongaku (音楽; literally Music) is the sixth studio album by Japanese rock band Tokyo Jihen, released on 9 June 2021 through EMI Records. The album was produced by the band and recording engineer Uni Inoue.

Background 
Tokyo Jihen had dissolved in 2012 and had only briefly unofficially reunited on December 31, 2016, as Shiina Ringo's backing band in the 67th NHK Kōhaku Uta Gassen. On January 1, 2020, Tokyo Jihen released a surprise digital single, "Erabarezaru Kokumin", and announced a tour of Japan titled "Live Tour 2020 News Flash", beginning February 29. In February, the band announced their 5-song EP News would be released on April 8, 2020.

On April 23, 2021, it was announced that the band would release their first full album after resuming activities on June 9, which is "Rock Day". At the same time, the album art and new artist photos of the band members were released, and a special site for the album was opened. On May 13, the music video of "Ryokushu", which was pre-distributed at the end of March, was released on YouTube. On June 3, as the album's release was approaching, a teaser video of the album was released.

Recording 
The recording of the album itself started in 2018, before the announcement of the band's reunion, and "Ryokushu" and "Aka no dōmei" were completed first. Recording continued intermittently after that until the band announced their reunion on January 1, 2020. Shiina wrote the lyrics for the new songs from January to March 2021, and recorded the songs to finish the whole thing.

This album includes various genres such as hip-hop, funk, soul, and rock. Additionally, Shiina said the album's chord work as "may be more jazz than funk", citing Miles Davis and Roy Hargrove as similarities. As with previous releases by the band and Shiina Ringo, the track listing has certain symmetries. Tracks 6 ("青のID", "Blue Period") and 8 ("赤の同盟", "Red Alliance") are both named after colors, while odd-number songs all feature male vocalists.

Chart performance 
In the first week of its release, the album reached the second place in CD sales (43,599 copies) and the 1st place in digital downloads (4,363) at Billboard Japan and its comprehensive "Hot Albums" chart. In addition, according to the Oricon "Weekly Album Ranking", Ongaku sold 42,904 copies in the first week, and made its debut in 2nd place. It also made its debut in 2nd place on "Oricon Combined Albums" with 49,886 points.

Track listing

References 

2021 albums
Tokyo Jihen albums
EMI Records albums